Gobindpur may refer to:
 Gobindpur, Jharkhand, a census town in Dhanbad district, Jharkhand state, India
 Gobindpur, Kapurthala, a village in Kapurthala district, Punjab State, India
 Gobindpur, Punjab, a village in Shaheed Bhagat Singh Nagar district, Punjab 
 Gobindpur, Khunti, a village in Jharkhand, India
 Gobindpur block, a community development block in Seraikela Kharsawan block in Jharkhand, India
 Gobindpur, Seraikela Kharsawan, a village in Jharkhand, India

See also
 Govindpur (disambiguation)
 Govindapura (disambiguation)
 Govindapur (disambiguation)
 Gobindapur (disambiguation)
 Chhota Gobindpur, a census town in East Singhbhum district, Jharkhand state, India